Kurian Kachappilly, born 6 July 1955, at Mallussery, in Kerala, India, is a Catholic priest of the Carmelites of Mary Immaculate (CMI) order, and a professor of philosophy, religion and Business Ethics.

Biography
Kachappilly was ordained a priest on 6 May 1986. Kachappilly was the President of the Pontifical Athenaeum, Dharmaram Vidya Kshetram, DVK (1918-2022). At present, he is the Coordinator of International Relations, DVK, Bangalore, India.
He holds a Master's degree in English Literature (M.Lit),  Master's in Psychology (MA), Licentiate in Philosophy (L.Ph), and PhD in Philosophy (K.U. Leuven, Belgium).

Later career
Kachappilly is a professor of philosophy, religion and management at Vidya Kshetram and Christ University,  both in Bangalore, India. He is the author of several books, including Mysticism without Bounds  and Mystic Musing in World Religions. His most popular books include "God of Love" and "Between Partners". Kachappilly studied philosophy at  Dharmaram Vidya Kshetram. During 1992-1996, he earned a Licentiate and PhD in philosophy from the Katholieke Universiteit Leuven, University of Leuven, Belgium. He is a well-known organizer of international conferences, like 7th International Whitehead Conference, Christ University, Bangalore;

Major contributions
Kachappilly was the chief organizer of the International Process Philosophy Congress in Bangalore (2009).  About 500 philosophers and intellectuals from Asia, Africa, Europe and United States attended this seventh international conference, jointly organized by Dharmaram College, Bangalore, Christ University, Bangalore and International Process Network (IPN). 

The second major conference was on "Mysticism without Bounds" (2011), and the Chief Guest was the Dalai Lama; and "Bounds of Ethics in a Globalized World" (2014), in which delegates and representatives from seventy plus countries took part. He is a TEDx Speaker. The latest International Conference was on "Harmony: Interface of Cosmic, Ethical and Religious Orders" (2019), jointly organized by Christ University and DVK, Bangalore, India.

Books 

Some of his important works are: 

 Kachappilly, Kurian, Mysticism without Bounds, New Delhi: Christian World Imprints, 2015.

 Kachappilly, Kurian, Mystic Musings in World Religions, New Delhi: Christian World Imprints, 2013.

 Kachappilly, Kurian, Mystic Musings in Art and Poetry, New Delhi: Christian World Imprints, 2013.

 Kachappilly, Kurian, ed. Process, Religion and Society (Dharmaram Process Series), Bangalore: Dharmaram Publications.

 Kachappilly, Kurian, Process: Implications and Applications, Bangalore: Dharmaram Publications, 2006.

 Kachappilly, Kurian, God-Talk Reconstructed: An Introduction to Philosophy of God, Bangalore: Dharmaram Publications, 2006.

 Kachappilly, Kurian, ed. God-Talk: Contemporary Trends and Trials, Bangalore: Dharmaram Publications, 2006.

 Kachappilly, Kurian, God of Love: A Neoclassical Inquiry, Bangalore: Dharmaram Publications, 2002. (Revised Edition).

 Kachappilly, Kurian, Word of God Retold, Bangalore: Dharmaram Publications, 2001.

 Kachappilly, Kurian, Between Partners, Bangalore: Asian Trading Corporation, 1999.

 Kachappilly, Kurian, God of Love Revisited, Bangalore: Dharmaram Publications, 1998.

 Kachappilly, Kurian, Fratelli Tutti: Perspectives, Delhi: Christian World Imprint, 2021.
 Kachappilly, Kurian, ed. Ad Aeternam Memoriam: A Festschrift in Honour of Prof. Dr. Paul Kalluveettil, Delhi: Christian World Imprint, 2022.

References

1955 births
20th-century Indian Roman Catholic priests
Living people
20th-century Indian Roman Catholic theologians
21st-century Indian Roman Catholic theologians